Avdey is an uncommon Russian male first name. The Russian language borrowed the name from Byzantine Christianity in the form of Avdiy ( or ), but in the colloquial usage it transformed into "Avdey". "Avdiy" continued to be a form used by the Russian Orthodox Church, having replaced an earlier form Audiy. The name derives either from the Biblical Hebrew obadyā (abdiyāhu), meaning god's slave, god's servant, or from Greek audēis, meaning sonorous, melodious—from the Biblical prophet Obadiah.

The diminutives of "Avdey" include Ava and Deya, as well as Avdeyka, Avdya, Avda, Avdyukha, Avdyusha, Avdasha, Avdyunya, Avdusya, Avdyusya, and Adya.

The patronymics derived from "Avdey" are "" (Avdeyevich; masculine) and its colloquial form "" (Avdeich), and "" (Avdeyevna; feminine).

Last names Avdonin, Avdokhin, Avdoshin, Avdyunin, and Avdyushin all derive from this first name.

References

Notes

Sources
Н. А. Петровский (N. A. Petrovsky). "Словарь русских личных имён" (Dictionary of Russian First Names). ООО Издательство "АСТ". Москва, 2005. 
[1] А. В. Суперанская (A. V. Superanskaya). "Современный словарь личных имён: Сравнение. Происхождение. Написание" (Modern Dictionary of First Names: Comparison. Origins. Spelling). Айрис-пресс. Москва, 2005. 
[2] А. В. Суперанская (A. V. Superanskaya). "Словарь русских имён" (Dictionary of Russian Names). Издательство Эксмо. Москва, 2005. 
И. М. Ганжина (I. M. Ganzhina). "Словарь современных русских фамилий" (Dictionary of Modern Russian Last Names). Москва, 2001. 
Ю. А. Федосюк (Yu. A. Fedosyuk). "Русские фамилии: популярный этимологический словарь" (Russian Last Names: a Popular Etymological Dictionary). Москва, 2006.